The 2011 Royal Bank Cup was the 41st Junior "A" 2011 ice hockey National Championship for the Canadian Junior Hockey League.  The 2011 Royal Bank Cup marked the 41st consecutive year a national championship has been awarded to this skill level since the breakaway of Major Junior hockey in 1970.

The Royal Bank Cup was competed for by the winners of the Doyle Cup, Anavet Cup, Dudley Hewitt Cup, the Fred Page Cup and the host city, the Camrose Kodiaks of the Alberta Junior Hockey League.

The tournament was hosted by the Camrose Kodiaks from April 30 to May 8, 2011, with all games played at the Edgeworth Centre in Camrose, Alberta.

After going a dismal 1 win and 3 losses in the round robin, the Pembroke Lumber Kings defeated the 3-1 hosts Camrose Kodiaks by a score of 4–2 to make their first ever final since the beginning of the round robin format.  In the final, the Lumber Kings drew the 2-time running National Champion Vernon Vipers who were 5-0 thus far in the tournament.  At the end of the first, Vernon outshot Pembroke 15-5 but the score was 0-0.  After the second, Pembroke led in shots 15-11 and yet the score was still 0-0.  In the third, Pembroke's Jonathan Milley scored on a clear-cut breakaway to take the lead.  Milley scored a late empty-netter to clinch the game.  Pembroke's Francis Dupuis stopped 40 shots for the shutout win.  Pembroke's victory is the first for any member of the Central Canada Hockey League since the Rockland Nationals won the 1976 Centennial Cup.

Teams
Camrose Kodiaks (Host)
Regular Season: 32-22-0-6 (7th Overall in AJHL)
Playoffs: Defeated Drumheller Dragons 3-1, Defeated Brooks Bandits 4-3, Defeated Okotoks Oilers 4-3, Lost to Spruce Grove Saints 1-4.
Vernon Vipers (Pacific)
Regular Season: 36-11-4-9 (2nd Overall in BCHL)
Playoffs: Defeated Westside Warriors 4-2, Defeated Salmon Arm Silverbacks 4-2, Defeated Powell River Kings 4-0, Defeated Spruce Grove Saints 4-3 for Doyle Cup.
Portage Terriers (West)
Regular Season: 40-15-0-7 (1st Overall in MJHL)
Playoffs: Defeated Swan Valley Stampeders 4-2, Defeated Dauphin Kings 4-2, Defeated Selkirk Steelers 4-1, Defeated La Ronge Ice Wolves 4-3 for Anavet Cup.
Wellington Dukes (Central)
Regular Season: 38-7-2-3 (2nd Overall in OJHL)
Playoffs: Defeated Upper Canada Patriots 4-0, Defeated Villanova Knights 4-1, Defeated Stouffville Spirit 4-2, Defeated Oakville Blades 4-1, Won Dudley Hewitt Cup (4-1).
Pembroke Lumber Kings (East)
Regular Season: 51-9-0-2 (1st Overall in CCHL)
Playoffs: Defeated Smiths Falls Bears 4-0, Defeated Gloucester Rangers 4-0, Defeated Cornwall Colts 4-2, Won Fred Page Cup (3-1).

Tournament

Round Robin

(x-) denotes Semi-final berth.

Results
All games at the Edgeworth Centre in Camrose, Alta.

Semi-final

Final

Awards
Roland Mercier Trophy (Tournament MVP): Dalyn Flette (Camrose Kodiaks)
Top Forward: Matthew Peca (Pembroke Lumber Kings)
Top Defencemen: Adam Thompson (Vernon Vipers)
Top Goaltender: Dalyn Flette (Camrose Kodiaks)
Tubby Smaltz Trophy (Sportsmanship): Dylan Walchuk (Vernon Vipers)

Roll of League Champions
AJHL: Spruce Grove Saints
BCHL: Vernon Vipers
CCHL: Pembroke Lumber Kings
MHL: Summerside Western Capitals
MJHL: Portage Terriers
NOJHL: Soo Eagles
OJHL: Wellington Dukes
QJAAAHL: Longueuil College Francais
SJHL: La Ronge Ice Wolves
SIJHL: Wisconsin Wilderness

See also
Canadian Junior A Hockey League
Royal Bank Cup
Anavet Cup
Doyle Cup
Dudley Hewitt Cup
Fred Page Cup

References

External links
Royal Bank Cup Website

2011
Royal Bank Cup
Sport in Camrose, Alberta
Royal Bank Cup